Forever is the sixth studio album by R&B singer Donell Jones. It was released on July 9, 2013, through eOne Music. The album debuted at number 20 on the US Billboard 200 with sales of 12,000 copies.

Critical reception

Allmusic editor Andy Kellman rated the album three ouf of five stars. He found that "more should be made of Jones' versatility. Forever is even closer to being a one-man show than 2010's Lyrics, with Jones performing every instrument but guitar, and he gets only a little songwriting assistance (and no guest appearances from MCs)." Kellmann noted that while "apart from the surprisingly brash "Step the F*** Off" and the Michael Jackson tribute "I Miss the King," not much sticks out, but the album is consistently likeable, filled with comfortable, mid-wattage grooves, yearning ballads (including the Teena Marie-sampling "Closer I Get to You"), and a couple diversions into racier content

Track listing
All tracks written and produced by Donell Jones (unless otherwise noted).

Charts

References

External links
[ Forever] at Allmusic

Donell Jones albums
2013 albums